Ural (Bashkir and ) is a rural locality (a village) in Yamadinsky Selsoviet, Yanaulsky District, Bashkortostan, Russia. The population was 73 as of 2010. There is 1 street.

Geography 
Ural is located 45 km southeast of Yanaul (the district's administrative centre) by road. Salikhovo is the nearest rural locality.

References 

Rural localities in Yanaulsky District